The 29th Berlin International Film Festival was held from 20 February – 3 March 1979. The Golden Bear was awarded to the West German film David directed by Peter Lilienthal.

Michael Cimino's The Deer Hunter was surrounded by controversy, as it was accused of racism, and several countries decided to withdraw their films from the festival in protest. The retrospective was dedicated to Italian actor Rudolph Valentino and to another one titled "We Danced Around the World. Revue Films".

Jury

The following people were announced as being on the jury for the festival:

 Jörn Donner, writer, director, screenwriter, actor and producer - Jury President (Finland)
 Julie Christie, actress (United Kingdom)
 Romain Gary, writer and screenwriter (France)
 Ingrid Caven, actress and singer (West Germany)
 Georg Alexander, (West Germany)
 Liliana Cavani, director and screenwriter (Italy)
 Paul Bartel, actor, director and screenwriter (United States)
 Pál Gábor, director and screenwriter (Hungary)
 Věra Chytilová, director and screenwriter (Czechoslovakia)

Films in competition
The following films were in competition for the Golden Bear award:

Out of competition
 Het verloren paradijs, directed by Harry Kümel (Belgium)

Key
{| class="wikitable" width="550" colspan="1"
| style="background:#FFDEAD;" align="center"| †
|Winner of the main award for best film in its section
|}

Retrospective

The following films were shown in the retrospective dedicated to Rudolph Valentino:

Awards
The following prizes were awarded by the Jury:
 Golden Bear: David by Peter Lilienthal
 Silver Bear – Special Jury Prize: Iskanderija... lih? by Youssef Chahine
 Silver Bear for Best Director: Astrid Henning-Jensen for Vinterbørn
 Silver Bear for Best Actress: Hanna Schygulla for Die Ehe der Maria Braun
 Silver Bear for Best Actor: Michele Placido for Ernesto!
 Silver Bear for an outstanding single achievement:
 Henning von Gierke for Nosferatu the Vampyre
 Sten Holmberg for Kejsaren
 Silver Bear: Die Ehe der Maria Braun

References

External links
29th Berlin International Film Festival 1979
1979 Berlin International Film Festival
Berlin International Film Festival:1979 at Internet Movie Database

29
1979 film festivals
1979 in West Germany
1970s in West Berlin